Janet Catherine Brehaut (born 24 July 1988) is a New Zealand former cricketer who played as a right-handed batter. She appeared in 3 One Day Internationals for New Zealand in 2011. She played domestic cricket for Canterbury.

References

External links

1988 births
Living people
Cricketers from Timaru
New Zealand women cricketers
New Zealand women One Day International cricketers
Canterbury Magicians cricketers